Josh Schertz is an American basketball coach who is the current head coach of the Indiana State Sycamores men's basketball team.

Coaching career
Schertz's coaching career began as a student assistant with Florida Atlantic for the 1999–2000 season. He'd then move on to Lynn, where he was an assistant for two seasons before a two-year assistant coaching stop at Queens University in North Carolina. In 2003, Schertz would follow Queens' head coach Bart Lundy to High Point where he'd stay until 2008 when he accepted the head coaching position at Lincoln Memorial.

In his 13 years coaching the Railsplitters posted 11-straight 20-win seasons, including four 30-win seasons en route to 10 NCAA Division II men's basketball tournament appearances. Schertz was also named South Atlantic Conference Coach of the Year a record seven times while also having the highest overall winning percentage among all active NCAA head coaches at any level in a 10-year period.

On March 17, 2021 Schertz was named the 26th head coach in Indiana State history, replacing Greg Lansing.

Head coaching record

References

Year of birth missing (living people)
Living people
American men's basketball coaches
College men's basketball head coaches in the United States
Florida Atlantic University alumni
High Point Panthers men's basketball coaches
Indiana State Sycamores men's basketball coaches
Lincoln Memorial Railsplitters men's basketball coaches
Lynn Fighting Knights men's basketball coaches
Queens Royals men's basketball coaches